Renson is a surname. Notable people with the surname include:

 Hugues Renson (born 1978), French politician
 Jordan Renson (born 1996), Belgian footballer